DVB is the acronym for Digital Video Broadcasting, a set of standards relating to digital television.

DVB may refer to:
Delhi Vidyut Board
Democratic Voice of Burma, expatriate broadcaster, broadcasting into Burma
Divinylbenzene, a benzene derivative used to make polymers
Dresdner Verkehrsbetriebe, the municipal transport company for Dresden in Germany
DVB Bank, a commercial transport finance company based in Frankfurt, Germany

See also
Donny van de Beek, Dutch footballer